Renaldo is a given name. Notable people with the name include:

Given name:
Renaldo "Obie" Benson (1937–2005), American soul and R&B singer and songwriter
Renaldo Balkman (born 1984), American professional basketball player
Renaldo Hill (born 1978), American football safety for the Denver Broncos of the National Football League
Renaldo Kalari (footballer) (born 1984), Albanian football player
Renaldo Kuhler (1931–2013), American artist and illustrator
Renaldo Lapuz (born 1962), Filipino-American who auditioned on the seventh season of the television series American Idol
Renaldo Lopes da Cruz (born 1970), Brazilian footballer who played as a forward for Ceilândia Esporte Clube
Renaldo Major (born 1982), American professional basketball player, a 6'7" 190 lb. small forward
Renaldo Nehemiah (born 1959), American athlete who dominated the 110 m hurdle event from 1978 until 1981
Renaldo Rama (born 1990), Albanian football player
Renaldo Snipes, (born 1956), American boxer from Houston, Texas
Renaldo Samsara (born 1988), Indonesian-English film director
Renaldo Turnbull (born 1966), former professional American football player
Renaldo Wynn (born 1974), American football defensive end

Other:
Duncan Renaldo (1904–1980), American actor who portrayed The Cisco Kid in films and TV
Renaldo and Clara, surrealist movie, directed by and starring Bob Dylan
Renaldo and the Loaf, English musical duo active in the late seventies and most of the eighties